Television in Senegal was introduced in 1965. 

The following is a list of television channels broadcast in Senegal.

Main channels

See also 
 List of television stations in Africa: Senegal
Khar Bii
 Media of Senegal
 List of newspapers in Senegal

 
Television